For Florida State Football, "sod games" and the Sod Cemetery have been a rich part of the Seminoles college football history, commemorating many of FSU greatest's victories away from home.  "Sod games"  represent the most difficult battles on the football field. The Sod Cemetery stands as a tribute to those triumphs.

In 1962, as the Seminoles completed their Thursday practice in preparation to face Georgia at Sanford Stadium, Dean Coyle Moore—a long-time professor and member of FSU's athletic board—issued a challenge: "Bring back some sod from between the hedges at Georgia." On Saturday, October 20, the Seminoles scored an 18-0 victory over the favored Bulldogs. Team captain Gene McDowell pulled a small piece of grass from the field, which was presented to Moore at the next football practice. Moore and FSU coach Bill Peterson had the sod buried on the practice field as a symbol of victory. A monument was placed to commemorate the triumph and the tradition of the sod game was born. Since 1988 the Keeper of the Sod Cemetery has been Tallahassee attorney Douglas Mannheimer. 

Before leaving for all road games in which Florida State is the underdog, all road games at the University of Florida and all ACC championship and bowl games, Seminole captains gather their teammates to explain the significance of the tradition. Victorious captains return with a piece of the opponent's turf to be buried in the Sod Cemetery inside the gates of the practice field.

In 2021, a bronze plaque was added to the Cemetery’s brick column beneath the main historic plaque; the new plaque reads: “During the seasons of 1976-2009, Coach Bobby Bowden and his teams won 63 Sod Victories.” 

At the Cemetery, fans and visitors can push a button on the fence and hear the history of the Sod Game Tradition. On Gamedays, a longer audio loop with the history,radio calls of great FSU football plays, and comments from legendary players are heard at the Cemetery during visits.  

From 2014, until the pandemic season of 2020, fans gathered at the Sod Cemetery 90 minutes before the kickoff for Sod Talk, where former Seminole players would return to tell the gathered fans about their days at Florida State. Notable participants included Charlie Ward, Warrick Dunn, Derrick Brooks, Marvin Jones, Fred Biletnikoff, Ron Simmons, Ron Sellers, Peter Warrick and Leroy Butler. Since the 2020 season, the live Gameday Sod Talks have been replaced by videos, produced by the university’s Seminole Productions. Notable participants in these presentations have included Bobby Bowden, Ron Sellers, Charlie Ward, Warrick Dunn, Kez McCorvey, Matt Frier, Peter Boulware and Corey Simon. 

Bowl game victories are colored ██ gold. Championship victories are colored ██ garnet.

Interments per opponent

References

Florida State Seminoles football
1962 establishments in Florida